Arnaud Dumond is a French classical guitarist, composer and teacher.

Training 
After having started in music as a self-taught musician, he undertook and completed higher education in classical guitar at the École Normale de Musique de Paris under the direction of Alberto Ponce. He attended the summer internships by Emilio Pujol and Narciso Yepes in Spain, John Williams in England, then benefited from the advice of Joseph Urshalmi whom he met on tour in Israel.

External links 
 Official website
 Article sur le site de Savarez - Fabricant de cordes pour instruments de musique http://www.savarez.fr/arnaud-dumond
 Entretien Arnaud Dumond with Leo Brouwer http://www.arnauddumond.com/data/auteur/temoignages/brouwer.pdf
 À propos "Le basson n'est pas contagieux" http://www.arnauddumond.com/fr.html#/auteur/articles-de-AD/ 
 Chronique "Un nouveau concerto pour le violoncelle de Bruno Giner" par Arnaud Dumond. Published in La Lettre du musicien, February 2001.
 À propos de Pierre Boulez et Maurice Ohanna by Arnaud Dumond - Article published in Cahiers de la Guitare, July 1982.
 About the essay La haine de la musique  by Pascal Quignard - Cahiers de la Guitare, 1997
 Arnaud Dumond - Zapateado - Rodrigo - Guitare Laplane (YouTube)

Year of birth missing (living people)
Living people
Place of birth missing (living people)
French classical guitarists
French male guitarists
École Normale de Musique de Paris alumni
French music educators
20th-century French musicians
21st-century French musicians
20th-century French male musicians
21st-century French male musicians
20th-century guitarists
21st-century guitarists
20th-century classical musicians
21st-century classical musicians